Amiral (a'l') is a particular garnish, such as poached sole, fillet of sole, stuffed turbot, or braised salmon. It contains some of the following ingredients:
fried oyster and mussels
crayfish tails or whole crayfish
mushroom caps
truffle slices. 

The dish can also be garnished with a Nantua sauce. The term also describes a type of consommé.

References

Fish dishes